The 1978 GP Ouest-France was the 42nd edition of the GP Ouest-France cycle race and was held on 22 August 1978. The race started and finished in Plouay. The race was won by Pierre-Raymond Villemiane.

General classification

References

1978
1978 in road cycling
1978 in French sport
August 1978 sports events in Europe